Erioneura is a genus of biting horseflies of the family Tabanidae.

Distribution
Brazil.

Species
Erioneura fuscipennis (Wiedemann, 1828)

References

Tabanidae
Diptera of South America
Endemic fauna of Brazil
Brachycera genera